Nevena Đurić (born 10 October 1993) is a Serbian politician. A member of the Serbian Progressive Party (SNS), she was elected to the National Assembly of Serbia in the 2020 Serbian parliamentary election. She has been serving as a vice president of the SNS since November 2021.

Early life and career
Đurić holds a master's degree in mathematics and is a professor in the field. She has served on the information council of the Progressive Party's municipal board in Kruševac and has participated in the party's Academic of Young Leaders program. Đurić has also been active with Kruševac's Chamber of Commerce.

Politician
Đurić received the thirty-eighth position on the Progressive Party's electoral list in the 2020 parliamentary election and was elected when the list won a landslide majority with 188 mandates. She is now a member of the health and family committee and the committee on education, science, technological development, and the information society; a deputy member of the economy, regional development, trade, tourism, and energy; a member of the subcommittee on the information society and digitization; a member of Serbia's delegation to the Parliamentary Assembly of the Organization of the Black Sea Economic Cooperation; the leader of Serbia's parliamentary friendship group with Moldova; and a member of the parliamentary friendship groups with Algeria, Argentina, Armenia, Australia, Azerbaijan, Belarus, Belgium, Bosnia and Herzegovina, Canada, China, Cuba, Cyprus, the Czech Republic, Egypt, France, Germany, Greece, Hungary, India, Indonesia, Iran, Iraq, Italy, Japan, Jordan, Liechtenstein, Montenegro, Norway, Poland, Portugal, Qatar, Romania, Russia, Slovakia, Slovenia, South Korea, Spain, Sweden, Switzerland, Tunisia, Turkey, Ukraine, the United Arab Emirates, the United Kingdom, the United States of America, and Zimbabwe. Đurić was elected as vice president of SNS in November 2021.

References

1993 births
Living people
Politicians from Kruševac
Members of the National Assembly (Serbia)
Members of the Parliamentary Assembly of the Black Sea Economic Cooperation
Serbian Progressive Party politicians
Women members of the National Assembly (Serbia)